Bedford Township may refer to:

 Bedford Township, Cross County, Arkansas, in Cross County, Arkansas
 Bedford Township, Wayne County, Illinois
 Bedford Township, Taylor County, Iowa
 Bedford Township, Calhoun County, Michigan
 Bedford Township, Monroe County, Michigan
 Bedford Township, Lincoln County, Missouri
 Bedford Township, Coshocton County, Ohio
 Bedford Township, Cuyahoga County, Ohio, defunct
 Bedford Township, Meigs County, Ohio
 Bedford Township, Bedford County, Pennsylvania

Township name disambiguation pages